Saud bin Abdulaziz Al Rashid (1898 – 1920) was the tenth Emir of Jabal Shammar between 1908 and 1920.

Biography 
It is likely that he was born in 1898, in Hail, and he was eight years old when his father was killed, and barely a year had passed since his father’s death, until his older brothers (Muteib the governor of Hail at the time, and Muhammad and Mishal) were killed by their uncle Sultan Al-Hamoud Al-Rashid, while he survived from The massacre when his uncles al-Sabhan fled to Medina, and lived there until the people of Hail sent to Hammoud al-Sabhan in 1908 asking to return with Prince Saud to take the leadership, knowing that Prince Saud could not assume the reins of government according to the customary constitution in Hail’s rule, Sfter the situation under the rule of Prince Saud Al-Hamoud Al-Rashid.

Saud arrived in Hail in 1908 at the age of thirteen years, and the witness was the words of the poet Muhammad al-Awni: Abu eight and six completed his age.. and the oldest teeth and crowns were the largest, so he took power under the tutelage of his uncle Hammoud al-Sabhan, who exercised the role of the actual ruler of the emirate, and in the same year 1908 the hollow fell from him A coup by Prince Nawaf Al-Shaalan and opened. After the death of Hammoud Al-Sabhan in 1909, he assumed the role of guardianship of Saud, Zamel Al-Salem Al-Ali Al-Sabhan.

In 1914, the guardianship of Saud officially ended and the reins of government passed to him, and his grandmother Fatima al-Sabhan, who hated the Wahhabis and the House of Saud, managed from behind the scenes.

Reign 

Saud arrived in Hail in 1908 at the age of eleven. He assumed power under the guardianship of his uncle, Prince Hammoud bin Sabhan Al-Sabhan, who exercised the role of the actual ruler of the emirate (Al-Sabhan from Shammar), and after the death of Prince Hammoud Al-Sabhan in 1909, he assumed the role of guardianship of Saud, Prince Zamel (the second). Al-Salem Al-Ali Al-Sabhan (husband of Princess Fatima bint Zamil I bin Sabhan), who was killed several years later by his plot. Then Prince Saud Al-Abd Al-Aziz officially assumed power in Hail and its aftermath.

Prince Saud made a decision to ally with the Ottoman Empire in the First World War, and allowed the Ottoman armies to use the lands belonging to Hail in the northern Hijaz, the Levant and southern Iraq. The Al Sabah and Al Saud had taken a stand with Britain's support after they had signed protection agreements with it.

The Emirate under the reign of Saud Al Rasheed saw a steady territorial gain. Ibn Saud tried many times to destroy the Emirate when it was under Saud but failed at every attempt. Jabal Shammar was becoming stabilized as they had high morale and support from the Ottomans was arriving.

Saud Al Rasheed in 1915 fought the Battle of Jarrab against Abdulaziz bin Abdul Rahman Al Saud, and was victorious. He was also able to recover Al- Jawf and its dependencies from Ibn Shaalan and annex them to the Emirate of Hail.

The battle of Ajumaima took place in 1910 where the 12 year old Saud Bin Abdulaziz Al Rasheeds forces defeated Alruoula and Unizah. He managed to assert his rule over Ha'il under the guardianship of Al Sabhan.

In the year 1910, Alsadoun asked support from the young emir against the House of Sabah in the Battle of Hayda where Saud and Alsadouns forces managed to defeat Sabah even though they had the support of Ibn Saud.

In 1916, Saud fought in the Battle of Abu Ajaj, Where Shammar defeated both Alshfair and Albudoor.

Assassination 

Saud al-Abd al-Aziz al-Rasheed was assassinated by his cousin Abdullah al-Talal al-Rashid in March 1920. The people of Hail have a consistent and proven account of the assassination scenario:

One afternoon in the year 1920 CE / 1338 AH, Prince Saud went out to hunt, towards a mountainous site in Hail called Al-Ghubran, and with him were: Prince Abdullah Al-Mutaib Al -Rasheed, Suleiman Al-Anbar, Daraan Al-Daraan, Rashid Al-Hussein, Al-Du’it, Salama Al-Farikh Mahdi Abu Sharrin. Abdullah Al-Talal Al-Rasheed heard about the prince’s departure for hunting, so he inquired about his destination, and when they told him, he took his companion Ibrahim Al-Mahous with him and left Hail to catch up with Prince Saud. He had weapons on him as usual.

Everyone reached Al-Ghubran, and Prince Saud sat leaning on a rock at the foot of the mountain. Near him was Al-Du’it, who was walking, as well as Abdullah Al-Mutaib Al-Rasheed, and Suleiman Al-Anbar was to his right, and Abdullah Al-Talal Al-Rasheed to his left, two meters behind him. The rest are scaling out of place, unaware of what will happen in seconds.

Abdullah Al-Talal took out an orange that was with him, then his cousin, Prince Saud, asked permission to set it as a target for shooting, so the prince agreed, and aimed his rifle at the target, hitting it accurately. Throw the target and hit it accurately. As soon as Prince Saud aimed his gun at the target again, Abdullah Al-Talal aimed his gun from behind at Saud's head (it was his target this time), and as soon as Prince Saud threw the target again, Abdullah Al-Talal fired his gun towards his target!

The young Prince Saud al-Abd al-Aziz fell into the arms of Suleiman Al-Anbar who hugged him while chanting: God! God! God!... He had thought that the gun had poked him in the chest, but as soon as he lifted it, he saw blood erupting from his head and neck! At that moment, Abdullah Al-Talal fired six bullets at Suleiman Al-Anbar, who was embracing the dead prince. And then the killer jumped on his horse, and his servant - the geek - jumped on the back of his horse and started racing with the wind towards Hail - in order to seize power.

The rest of the escorts heard the sounds of shooting bullets, and Al-Du’it climbed on a nearby rock to see what was the matter, and he saw Prince Saud lying with Suleiman Al-Ambar next to him. Al-Du’it hurried to inquire, so Suleiman Al-Anbar raised his head and shouted at him: “Kill the prince, fight Abdullah Al-Talal and kill him...kill him.”

Al-Du'it and Mahdi Abu Shereen quickly left towards Hail and were able to catch up with Abdullah Al-Talal and his escort before they reached Hail.

Then the escorts gathered, not knowing what to do. The prince was killed and his killer was killed, so they sent Al-Da’it to Ha’il, in order to explore the situation and see if the group knew anything about the accident. Al-Du’it arrived in Hail, and found that the people did not know anything, so he returned to his friends and told them. Then they headed towards Hail and told the group what had happened, so the funeral of the slain prince took place, and the group chose Abdullah Al-Mutaib Al-Rasheed as governor of Hail after him.

Personal life
Although he was only twenty-two years old when he was killed, Saud bin Abdulaziz Al-Rashid was already married several times (perhaps five times) and he was the father of five children.

Fahda bint Asi bin Shuraim Al Shammari of the Abda section of the Shammar tribe was the mother of two of Al-Rashid's sons, namely Abdulaziz and Mishaal. After Al-Rashid's death, Fahda married Ibn Saud, becoming his ninth wife. She would bear Ibn Saud three children, including King Abdullah of Saudi Arabia.

References

External links
Al Rasheed on hukam.net, with pictures and flags. 

20th-century murdered monarchs
20th-century rulers in Asia
1898 births
1920 deaths
Arabs from the Ottoman Empire
House of Rashid